The De Vere Northumberland Seniors Classic was a men's professional golf tournament on the European Seniors Tour from 1995 to 2005. Until 2002 it was called the De Vere Hotels Seniors Classic.The tournament was held at Belton Woods near Grantham from 1995 to 1998, Ferndown Golf Club, Ferndown, Dorset in 1999 and 2000, and Slaley Hall, near Hexham, Northumberland from 2001 to 2005.

Winners

External links
Coverage on the European Seniors Tour's official site

Former European Senior Tour events
Golf tournaments in England
Recurring sporting events established in 1995
Recurring sporting events disestablished in 2005